Austin Miller (born 1976) is an American actor.

Austin Miller may also refer to:

Austin S. Miller (born 1961), American general
Austin Timeous Miller (1888–1947), British-Indian officer